Hengler is a surname. Notable people with the surname include:

 Jenny Hengler (1849– c. 1892), British equestrian performer
 Lorenz Hengler (1806–1858), German priest and inventor of the horizontal pendulum
 Sarah Hengler (c. 1765–1845), British businesswoman and firework artist